Elaphidion jamaicensis is a species of beetle in the family Cerambycidae. It was described by Fisher in 1932.

References

J
Beetles of North America
Insects of Jamaica
Beetles described in 1932